The 2021 Johan Cruyff Shield was the 25th edition of the Johan Cruyff Shield (Dutch: Johan Cruijff Schaal), an annual Dutch football match played between the winners of the previous season's Eredivisie and KNVB Cup. The match was contested by the winners of the 2020–21 Eredivisie and the 2020–21 KNVB Cup on 7 August 2021.

As Ajax won both the Eredivisie and the KNVB Cup, the Eredivisie runners-up, PSV Eindhoven, participated in the 2021 Johan Cruyff Shield.

The defending champions were Ajax, who won the 2019 Johan Cruyff Shield. The 2020 Johan Cruyff Shield was cancelled as a result of the COVID-19 pandemic in the Netherlands.

PSV Eindhoven won the match 4–0 for their record twelfth Johan Cruyff Shield.

It was also the last match for referee Björn Kuipers.

Match

Details

See also 

 2020–21 Eredivisie
 2020–21 KNVB Cup
 AFC Ajax–PSV Eindhoven rivalry

References 

2021–22 in Dutch football
Johan Cruyff Shield
AFC Ajax matches
PSV Eindhoven matches
August 2021 sports events in the Netherlands